Nuclear Energy was considered as an alternative source of energy after the 1973 oil crisis, in which the Philippines was affected. The Bataan Nuclear Power Plant was built in the early 1980s as a result, but never went into operation. It was mothballed by Former President Corazon Aquino on the fear of reactor meltdown after the Chernobyl Disaster as well as the increase of the price of the plant. The Fukushima nuclear disaster dampened further efforts to revive nuclear energy in the philippines and gave pause to efforts to revive the plant.

There have been proposals in 2009 and 2016 to operate the Bataan Nuclear Power Plant.

The Philippine Research Reactor-1 had been operated from 1963 until 1988 by the Philippine Nuclear Research Institute in Quezon City.

In December 2020 a group of experts from International Atomic Energy Agency (IAEA) was invited by the Philippine government to review the country's nuclear infrastructure. Energy Secretary Alfonso Cusi has been quoted saying that the mission will help with finally making nuclear power a part of the country's energy mix.

On February 28, 2022, President Rodrigo Duterte approved and signed a executive order to include nuclear power in the country's energy mix, as authorities prepare to phase out of coal-fired power plants and after earlier efforts failed due to safety concerns. It states that it can combat the power outages and the electricity prices, despite of environmental radiation concerns. Duterte said nuclear power would be tapped as a viable alternative baseload power source as the Philippines seeks to retire coal plants to help meet climate goals. The weak electrical grid connections between the over 1000 inhabited islands of the Philippine archipelago presents a challenge to a nuclear policy. The mothballed Bataan Nuclear Power Plant is close to Manila, the largest electrical demand location, so is an option for revival or the site of a new plant.

The Bataan Nuclear Power Plant 

Under a regime of martial law, Philippine President Ferdinand Marcos in July 1973 announced the decision to build a nuclear power plant. This was in response to the 1973 oil crisis, as the Middle East oil embargo had put a heavy strain on the Philippine economy, and Marcos believed nuclear power to be the solution to meeting the country's energy demands and decreasing dependence on imported oil.

Construction on the Bataan Nuclear Power Plant began in 1976. Following the 1979 Three Mile Island accident in the United States, construction on the BNPP was stopped, and a subsequent safety inquiry into the plant revealed over 4,000 defects (not confirmed). Among the issues raised was that it was built near major faults and close to the then dormant Pinatubo volcano.

Issues of overpricing, bribery, corruption, mismanagement were also raised.

In 2009, a bill was filed in the Philippine House of Representatives to recommission and operate the Bataan Nuclear Power Plant. The cost for rehabilitation was placed at USD1 billion, to be shouldered by taxpayers through loans and additional charges to consumers. The Center for Environmental Concerns-Philippines, No to BNPP Revival, and Advocates of Science and Technology for the People (AGHAM), and the Freedom from Debt Coalition opposed the bill, saying that the nuclear plant was defective and dangerous and harbored technical flaw. Concerns were also raised in the House of Representatives concerning nuclear waste disposal, geological hazards, and unfinished debt payments.

The Department of Energy of the Philippines in 2016 revived proposals to operate the Bataan Nuclear Power Plant, with the cost for rehabilitating the plant estimated at USD1 billion. Proponents to revive the plant cite possible cost saving and sustainability. Issues were raised against the plant in the Philippine Senate and by Greenpeace Philippines, No to BNPP, Nuclear Free Bataan Movement, and Balanga (Bataan) Bishop Ruperto Santos regarding corruption, cost, and safety.

See also
Electricity sector in the Philippines
Philippine Research Reactor-1
Philippine Nuclear Research Institute
Anti-nuclear movement in the Philippines

References